This is a list of schools in Conwy County Borough in Wales.

Primary schools

Ysgol Awel y Mynydd
Ysgol Babanod Glan Gele
Ysgol Babanod Llanfairfechan
Ysgol Babanod Mochdre
Ysgol Babanod Penmaenrhos
Ysgol Babanod T. Gwynn Jones
Ysgol Babanod Y Foryd
Ysgol Bendigaid William Davies
Ysgol Betws-y-Coed
Ysgol Betws-yn-Rhos
Ysgol Bod Alaw 
Ysgol Bodafon
Ysgol Bro Aled
Ysgol Bro Cernyw
Ysgol Bro Gwydir
Ysgol Capel Garmon
Ysgol Capelulo
Ysgol Cerrigydrudion
Ysgol Craig y Don
Ysgol Cynfran
Ysgol Cystennin
Ysgol Deganwy
Ysgol Dolwyddelan
Ysgol Eglwysbach
Ysgol Ffordd Dyffryn
Ysgol Glan Conwy
Ysgol Glan Morfa
Ysgol Glanwydden
Ysgol Iau Hen Golwyn
Ysgol Iau Sant Elfod
Ysgol Llanddoged
Ysgol Llanddulas
Ysgol Llandrillo-yn-Rhos
Ysgol Llangelynnin
Ysgol Llangwm
Ysgol Llannefydd
Ysgol Llansansiôr
Ysgol Maes Owen
Ysgol Morfa Rhianedd
Ysgol Nant y Groes
Ysgol Pant y Rhedyn
Ysgol Pencae
Ysgol Penmachno
Ysgol Pen-y-Bryn
Ysgol Pentrefoelas
Ysgol Porth-y-Felin
Ysgol San Siôr
Ysgol Sant Joseff
Ysgol Swn y Don
Ysgol Talhaiarn
Ysgol Tudno
Ysgol y Plas
Ysgol Dyffryn yr Enfys
Ysgol Ysbyty Ifan

Secondary schools
Ysgol Aberconwy
Ysgol Bryn Elian
Ysgol Dyffryn Conwy
Ysgol Eirias 
Ysgol Emrys Ap Iwan
Ysgol John Bright
Ysgol y Creuddyn

Special schools
Ysgol y Gogarth

Independent schools
Rydal Penrhos
St David's College, Llandudno

 
Conwy